The 2002 United States Senate election in Colorado was held on November 5, 2002. Incumbent Republican U.S. Senator Wayne Allard won re-election to a second term.

Democratic primary

Candidates 
  Tom Strickland, former U.S. Attorney for the District of Colorado and Democratic nominee for the U.S. Senate in 1996

Results

Republican primary

Candidates 
 Wayne Allard, incumbent U.S. Senator first elected in 1996

Results

General election

Candidates 
 Wayne Allard (R), incumbent U.S. Senator first elected in the 1996 Senate election
  Tom Strickland, former U.S. Attorney for the District of Colorado and Democratic nominee for the U.S. Senate in 1996

Debates
Complete video of debate, September 7, 2002

Predictions

Polling

Results

See also 
 2002 United States Senate election

Notes

References 

2002 Colorado elections
Colorado
2002